Liberty Park may refer to:
 Liberty Park (Salt Lake City), Utah, U.S.
 Liberty Park (Manhattan), New York, U.S.
 Liberty Park, Los Angeles, Koreatown, Los Angeles, U.S.
 Liberty Park, Camden, a neighborhood in New Jersey, U.S.
 Liberty Park (New Jersey) now called Liberty State Park, New Jersey, U.S.
 Liberty State Park (HBLR station), a light rail station in Liberty State Park
 Liberty Park 9/11 Memorial, a memorial in Liberty State Park